Ronald Areshenkoff (June 13, 1957 – December 15, 2019) was a Canadian professional ice hockey centre.  He was drafted in the second round, 32nd overall, by the Buffalo Sabres in the 1977 NHL amateur draft.  He played in four games in the National Hockey League with the Edmonton Oilers, going scoreless. He died in 2019 in his hometown of Grand Forks after a long illness.

Career statistics

Regular season and playoffs

Awards
 WCHL Second All-Star Team – 1977

References

External links
 

1957 births
2019 deaths
Buffalo Sabres draft picks
Canadian ice hockey centres
Edmonton Oilers players
Hershey Bears players
Houston Apollos players
Ice hockey people from British Columbia
Medicine Hat Tigers players
New England Whalers draft picks
Vernon Vikings players